Giffoni Valle Piana, commonly known as Giffoni, is a town and comune in the Province of Salerno, Campania, southwestern Italy.

Economy is mostly based on agriculture, with the presence of a small number of light industries and services firms.

History
Giffoni area was the seat of the ancient town of Picenza, which was destroyed two times by the Romans in the course of their conquest of southern Italy.

Geography

The town is situated in a hill zone by the Picentini mountains. The municipality is extended from the urban and industrial area between Salerno and Pontecagnano to the mountain range at the borders with the Province of Avellino. It borders with the municipalities of Acerno, Calvanico, Giffoni Sei Casali, Montecorvino Pugliano, Montecorvino Rovella, Montella, Pontecagnano Faiano, Salerno, San Cipriano Picentino and Serino.

Giffoni is divided into 14 frazioni and Mercato, commonly also identified simply as Giffoni Valle Piana, is the administrative seat. The other parishes are Catelde, Chiaravallisi, Chieve, Curti, Curticelle, Ornito, San Giovanni, Santa Caterina, Santa Maria a Vico, Sardone, Sovvieco, Terravecchia and Vassi.

Giffoni Film Festival

Since 1971 the town has hosted the biggest international children's film festival of the world.

Notable people
 

Agostino Falivene (?−1548), Roman Catholic bishop

See also
Monti Picentini
Giffoni Sei Casali

References

External links

Official website 

Cities and towns in Campania